The Battle of Cape Bon may refer to:

Battle of Cape Bon (468), where the Vandals under Gaiseric defeated Eastern Roman General Basiliscus
Battle of Cape Bon (1941), battle during World War II between two Italian light cruisers and an Allied destroyer flotilla